Victoria Grant (née Blackledge; b. 26 August 1982) is a New Zealand rugby union coach and former player. She played for  internationally and for Auckland at provincial level. She was recently appointed as Head Coach of Hurricanes Poua.

Biography 
Grant has a bachelor's degree in Health Science majoring in Physiotherapy and a post-graduate diploma in Sports Medicine. She was named Women's player of the year.

Grant was a member of the Black Ferns champion 2006 Rugby World Cup squad. She made her test debut at the tournament on 4 September 2006 against Samoa at Edmonton. She was also part of the 2010 Rugby World Cup winning squad.

In September 2022, Grant was appointed as the new Head Coach of Hurricanes Poua for the 2023 Super Rugby Aupiki season.

References

External links
Black Ferns profile

1982 births
Living people
New Zealand women's international rugby union players
New Zealand female rugby union players
New Zealand female rugby sevens players
New Zealand women's international rugby sevens players
New Zealand rugby union coaches